Greg Centauro (January 10, 1977 – March 26, 2011) was a French pornographic actor and director.

Career
Centauro came to notoriety in France during the early 2000s when he and his then-girlfriend Clara Morgane became porn actors at the same time. Morgane, who performed most of her heterosexual scenes with Centauro, quickly became France's most popular adult actress. However, she retired from porn after two years, and Centauro wished to continue his career. The two eventually separated. Centauro continued to perform in porn films in France, where he also started directing. He later moved to Budapest, the porn capital of Europe, where he became specialized in gonzo pornography. He was the in-house producer for Paradise Film Entertainment.

Death
Centauro died in Budapest of a cocaine overdose  on March 26, 2011 while he was in the shooting phase of Nut, Butts and Euro Sluts 2.

Personal life
Centauro was married to Hungarian glamour model and pornographic actress Vera Versanyi from 2005 to 2011. Centauro was a dedicated fan of the German rock outfit Rammstein.

Partial filmography
 Anal History
 Fucking Beautiful 7
 Nuts, Butts, Euro Sluts
 Pretty Chicks
 Das Edelmodel
 Sex Maniac Bitches

Film labels
 Paradise Film Entertainment
 Digital Sin
 Platinum X Pictures
 Zero Tolerance

Awards and nominations
 2007 eLine Award, winner - Best International Series - Ass Drippers (Paradise Film)
 2007 eLine Award, winner - Best International Actor
 2008 eLine Award, winner - Best German Actor
 2009 Erotixxx Award, winner - Best German Film - Black and White 4 U (Paradise Film)

References

External links
 Paradise Film - official website
 
 
 

French pornographic film directors
French male pornographic film actors
French pornographic film producers
2011 deaths
1977 births
Mass media people from Marseille
Cocaine-related deaths
Accidental deaths in Hungary
Sex workers drug-related deaths